The Pasiphae group is a group of retrograde irregular satellites of Jupiter that follow similar orbits to Pasiphae and are thought to have a common origin.

Their semi-major axes (distances from Jupiter) range between 22.8 and 24.1 million km (the same range as the Carme group), their inclinations between 144.5° and 158.3°, and their eccentricities between 0.25 and 0.43.

Core members of the group include (negative periods indicate retrograde orbits):

The International Astronomical Union (IAU) reserves names ending in -e for all retrograde moons.

Origin
The Pasiphae group is believed to have been formed when Jupiter captured an asteroid which subsequently broke up after a collision. The original asteroid was not disturbed heavily: the original body is calculated to have been 60 km in diameter, about the same size as Pasiphae; Pasiphae retains 99% of the original body's mass. However, if Sinope belongs to the group, the ratio is much smaller, 87%.

Unlike the Carme and Ananke groups, the theory of a single impact origin for the Pasiphae group is not accepted by all studies. This is because the Pasiphae group, while similar in semi-major axis, is more widely dispersed in inclination. Alternatively, Sinope might be not a part of the remnants of the same collision and captured independently instead. The differences of colour between the objects (grey for Pasiphae, light red for Callirrhoe and Megaclite) also suggest that the group could have a more complex origin than a single collision.

Notes

References

 
Moons of Jupiter
Irregular satellites
Moons with a retrograde orbit